Edgar Henry Garland (1895 – 4 May 1973) was a New Zealand officer, known for numerous escapes from German prisoners camps during WWI. He was regarded as one of the most cunning and slippery of the British officers by the German War Office. He became a famous around the end of the war and got the nickname "The Elusive Garland".

Biography 
Garland was born in Wellington, New Zealand, in 1895. He was a New Zealand soldier in World War I. He trained as a pilot at the New Zealand Flying School at Kohimarama, Auckland in 1916. Garland was serving with Unit – RFC(SR) 66 Squadron, flying Sopwith Scout (Pup) B1767. He made twenty-four flights over the German lines before being shot down on 22 August 1917. He made a forced landing in Ostend and was interned at the Holzminden prisoner of war camp, reserved for British and British Empire officers. He participated in the largest POW escape of the war – the first "Great Escape" in July 1918. During this escape twenty nine officers escaped, but only ten made it out of Germany and, eventually, to Britain. Flight-Lieutenant Garland went on to make a total of eight escape attempts. As a result of these escape attempts Garland obtained the nickname "The Elusive Garland".

One of the early books about his escape attempts, published firstly in the early 1920s describes Garland:

Garland was later held prisoner in Cologne and again attempted to escape. With the assistance of a fellow prisoner who was a tailor, Garland managed to make a suit and hat. When the camp was visited by several civilians Garland donned his suit, hat and carrying a German newspaper, managed to walk out of the prisoner of war camp.

The Official newspaper of the New Zealand Society of Great Britain published a letter addressed to Garland from his mother. The letter was despatched from his mother in Wellington on 26 July 1916. By the time card reached him, he was already shot down and was a prisoner of war in Holzminden. This reached him on 2 November 1918, via the High Commissioner in London. This happened seven days before the Armistice finished the war.

After the war Garland was sent to the United States as member of the British Military Mission. He subsequently accepted employment with a United States aeronautical company established by Henry Woodhouse.

References 

New Zealand military personnel
1895 births
1973 deaths